Sponghøi is a mountain in Skjåk Municipality in Innlandet county, Norway. The mountain is surrounded by several other notable mountains including Storhøa to the north, Digerkampen to the southeast, Dørkampen to the southeast, Høggøymen to the southwest, and Benkehøa to the northwest.

See also
List of mountains of Norway

References

Skjåk
Mountains of Innlandet